Coeloma is an extinct genus of crabs belonging to the family Mathildellidae. The genus includes 19 species, distributed among several subgenera, and is in need of revision. The fossil record of the genus extends from the Eocene to the Miocene.

Species

 Coeloma balticum
 Coeloma bicarinatum
 Coeloma birsteini
 Coeloma credneri
 Coeloma dentatum
 Coeloma egerense
 Coeloma glabra
 Coeloma granulosum
 Coeloma incarinatum
 Coeloma isseli
 Coeloma latifrons
 Coeloma macoveii
 Coeloma macrodactylus
 Coeloma martinezensis
 Coeloma rupeliense
 Coeloma sabatium
 Coeloma taunicum
 Coeloma varelata
 Coeloma vigil

References

 Paleobiology Database

Goneplacoidea
Eocene genus first appearances
Miocene genus extinctions